Anania epipaschialis is a moth in the family Crambidae. It was described by George Hampson in 1912. It is found in Cameroon, the Democratic Republic of the Congo, Equatorial Guinea, Nigeria, Sierra Leone and Uganda.

References

Moths described in 1912
Pyraustinae
Moths of Africa